This is a list of television programs broadcast on the Jetix blocks on Toon Disney and ABC Family.

Former programming
 1 Also aired on ABC Kids.
 2 Integrated into the Disney XD initial lineup.

Original programming

Syndicated from Disney Channel

Syndicated from ABC

Syndicated from UPN

Syndicated from BKN

Syndicated from Kids' WB!

Syndicated from Fox Kids

Syndicated from 4Kids TV

Syndicated from TV Tokyo

Acquired programming

References

Jetix original programming
Television programming blocks in the United States
Disney Channel related-lists